John Kevin Callahan (December 23, 1953 – March 28, 2020) was an American actor, known for his work as Edmund Grey on the daytime soap opera All My Children.

Early life
Callahan was born in Brooklyn, New York. He was a pre-law student at University of California at Berkeley before pursuing a career in acting.

Career
Callahan portrayed Leo Russell on the daytime soap General Hospital from 1984 to 1985. Subsequent roles included Eric Stavros on the prime time series Falcon Crest from 1986 to 1988, and Craig Hunt on the daytime soap Santa Barbara from 1989 to 1991. He played Edmund Grey, his best known role, on All My Children from 1992 to 2005. Callahan also appeared as Edmund, with co-star Esta TerBlanche, in a 1997 episode of the sitcom Spin City called "My Life is a Soap Opera". From 2008 to 2010, he played Richard Baker on Days of Our Lives.

Callahan and his co-star Eva LaRue co-hosted both  the Lifetime series Weddings of a Lifetime in 1995 and the 1997 Miss America pageant.

Callahan appeared on the 1990 revival of the television game show To Tell the Truth as a celebrity panelist.

Personal life
Callahan was married to Linda Freeman from 1982 to 1994, and has two stepsons from the union. He married his All My Children co-star Eva LaRue, who portrayed Edmund's love interest Maria Santos, on November 30, 1996 on the island of Lanai in Hawaii. They have a daughter, Kaya McKenna, born in December 2001. They divorced in 2005. Callahan died on March 28, 2020, after suffering a stroke the previous day, and having been taken to Eisenhower Medical Center in Rancho Mirage where he was put on life support.

Filmography

Film

Television

Documentaries and videos

References

Citations

Sources

External links
 

1953 births
2020 deaths
American male soap opera actors
People from Brooklyn
Male actors from New York City